Danggali Conservation Park is a protected area located about  north of Renmark in South Australia. The conservation park was proclaimed under the National Parks and Wildlife Act 1972 in 1976.  In 2009, a portion of the conservation park was excised to create the Danggali Wilderness Protection Area. The conservation park is classified as an IUCN Category Ia protected area.

See also
 Protected areas of South Australia
 Danggali, South Australia
 Riverland Biosphere Reserve
 Riverland Mallee Important Bird Area

References

External links
Danggali Conservation Park and Wilderness Protection Area official webpage
Danggali Conservation Park  webpage on protected planet

Conservation parks of South Australia
Protected areas established in 1976
1976 establishments in Australia